Socrates-Demosthenes School (École Socrates-Démosthene) (Σχολείο Σωκράτης-Δημοσθένης) (www.socdem.org) is an elementary school in the province of Quebec that serves students in Greater Montreal while also servicing the members of the Hellenic Community of Greater Montreal.

Founded in 1909, the school offers a trilingual program (French, Greek and English), and while following the curriculum provided by MELS, it also teaches aspects of Greek history and culture according to the pedagogical program provided by the Ministry of Education of Greece.

Campus
Socrates and Demosthenes Primary  School has six campuses in greater Montreal to better serve all students and the Greek community alike: Montreal, Laval, West Island and the South Shore (Montreal).

SOCRATES II
5777, ave Wilderton, Montréal., H3S 2V7

In 1982, the community bought a new lot of land to build a new community center. This community center was also planned to have a school. This would later on be established as the 2nd campus of the Socrates schools. This building has a cathedral, a library, a reception hall, a gym, 27 classrooms (including a daycare center "Ta Paidakia"), and many administrative offices. Today, 250 students attend the school.

SOCRATES III 
11, 11e rue, Roxboro, H8Y 1K6

In 1982, a new building is built in Roxboro to attend to its Greek student population. This building consists of 29 classrooms (including a daycare center), a library, a gym, and many administrative offices. Today, more than 200 students attend this school.

SOCRATES IV
5220, Grande Allée, St-Hubert, J3Y 1A1

In 1985, the H.C.M. agreed to build not only an elementary school (which would be the 4th campus built by the community) but also a community center that would be able to serve the full population of the South-Shore region. The building has a church, 18 classrooms (including a daycare center), a multimedia room, a library, a cafeteria, a gym, and many administrative offices. Today, the school consists of about 100 students.

SOCRATES V
931, Emerson, Laval, H7W 3Y5

SOCRATES V(ANNEX)
1005, boul Pie X, Laval, H7V 3A9

In 1990, the H.C.M. bought a new building to serve to the students of the Laval community. This building consists of 23 classrooms, a gym, a library, and some administrative offices. Even though it is the smallest building in all the H.C.G.M (besides its annex bought in 2002 to attend a daycare and the kindergarten groups of the 5th campus) it has the largest number of students, consisting of about 500 students.

DEMOSTHENES
1565, boul. St-Martin O. Laval, H7S 1N1

In 2011, the H.C.M. bought the Hellenic community of Laval along with all its organizations. One of the biggest interests of the H.C.M. was their elementary school, Demosthenes. Today, this school has more than 200 students. It is the newest addition to the community's schools.

In total, the schools consist of about 1 300 students. This number is growing every year. It is the pride of not only the H.C.G.M. but of the Greek Embassy of Canada as well.

Future projects

NEW BUILDING IN LAVAL

In 2013, the H.C.G.M. had begun efforts to sell all school buildings in Laval to provide a better service in a new building that would be constructed in back of Laval's major Greek Orthodox Church, The Saint-Cross Church. This building would consist of many modern aspects. construction has been foreseen to begin in 2014, after all buildings have been sold.

FUTURE HIGH SCHOOL PROJECTS

For more than 30 years, the community has been talking about building a high school for the students that would graduate the elementary schools. Lately, this project has been put under a serious note. If all construction projects go well for the new elementary building in Laval, then further research will be done to make this future project possible.

References 

Educational institutions established in 1909
Elementary schools in Montreal
Greek-Canadian culture
Greek international schools
Schools in Laval, Quebec
Elementary schools in Longueuil
1909 establishments in Quebec